Ashish R Mohan is an Indian film director and actor. His work as a director include Khiladi 786 and Welcome 2 Karachi.

He started his career as an assistant director with Anil Devgan on the film Blackmail starring Ajay Devgn.
 
During the making of Blackmail, he got in touch with Rohit Shetty and assisted him on his movies including the hits Golmaal, Golmaal Returns, All the Best: Fun Begins and Golmaal 3. Ashish made his directorial debut with Khiladi 786 which was one of the highest grossers of 2012. His second directorial venture Welcome 2 Karachi opened to an average response at the box office and got mixed reviews from the critics.

Personal life
Mohan married costume designer Komal Shahani in February 2012.

Filmography

Director

Assistant Director and Chief Assistant Director

References

External links
 

Living people
Hindi-language film directors
21st-century Indian film directors
Year of birth missing (living people)